A high chair is a piece of furniture used for feeding older babies and younger toddlers. The seat is raised a fair distance from the ground, so that a person of adult height may spoon-feed the child comfortably from a standing position (hence the name). It often has a wide base to increase stability. There is a tray which is attached to the arms of the high chair, which allows the adult to place the food on it for either the child to pick up and eat or for the food to be spoon-fed to them.

A booster chair is meant to be used with a regular chair to boost the height of a child sufficiently.  Some boosters are a simple monolithic piece of plastic.  Others are more complex and are designed to fold up and include a detachable tray.

Rarely, a chair can be suspended from the edge of the table avoiding the need for an adult chair or a high chair.

Designs & Styles 
There are five main high chair designs:

 Standard - Also known as traditional or classic high chairs, these are just raised seats. They may or may not come with a harness or table.
 Convertible - These modular high chairs, also called grow-with-me high chairs, are designed to be both multifunctional and useful past infancy. The first examples of these date back to the 19th century, which were high chairs that could transform into strollers and rocking chairs. These chairs can be easily disassembled and adjusted to fit a child as they grow, often converting into either booster chairs for toddlers or standalone full-size chairs that can be used by adults.
 Foldable - Foldable high chairs collapse flat for easy transportation and storage.
 Portable - Like a foldable high chair, portable or travel high chairs are designed for transportation. They are made with lightweight materials that are usually fabric or plastic.
 Hook On - Space-saver high chairs either attach to the side of the table with clamps or are large booster seats with a detachable table.

Potential accidents 
High chairs can result in child-related accidents.

Safety standards 

The EU standard EN 14988:2017+A1:2020 has been published in 2020 by the European Committee for Standardization.

References 

Babycare
Chairs
Infancy